Salim M'Hamed Arrache (born 14 July 1982) is an Algerian former professional footballer who played as a left winger.

Early years
Born in Marseille, France, to parents from Béjaïa (north-eastern Algeria), Arrache began to play for the local club of his neighborhood, the Batarelle, Northern Marseille in 1995.

Career
On 20 July 2009, Arrache left Olympique de Marseille after both sides reached a mutual agreement to terminate his contract.

He signed a one-year contract with SC Bastia shortly after. On 4 December 2009, Bastia announced they have reached a mutual agreement to end Arrache's contract, four months after his arrival.

On 6 June 2011, Arrache signed a one-year contract with Kuwaiti side Qadsia SC. On 9 August 2011, however, the club terminated his contract after he failed to impress the coach in pre-season friendlies.

On 25 July 2012, he participated in a trial match for the Western Sydney Wanderers. This match was the first ever match the new club played, but Arrache was passed over and did not stay with the club after this match.

On 2 February 2013, he reportedly went for a trial to the Malaysian based club, Kelantan FA.

In February 2014, after seven months back in France with AC Ajaccio, Arrache's contract was terminated on a mutual agreement, allowing him to sign a new contract in China with Chengdu Tiancheng.

Nearly five years after retiring, Arrache played for French amateur club, SC La Cayolle, in 2020.

Career statistics

Honours
Strasbourg
 Coupe de la Ligue: 2005

References

External links
 
 

Living people
1982 births
Footballers from Marseille
Association football wingers
Algerian footballers
Algeria international footballers
French sportspeople of Algerian descent
French people of Kabyle descent
Expatriate footballers in France
Algerian expatriate footballers
Marignane Gignac Côte Bleue FC players
RC Strasbourg Alsace players
Olympique de Marseille players
Toulouse FC players
Stade de Reims players
SC Bastia players
PAS Giannina F.C. players
AC Ajaccio players
Chengdu Tiancheng F.C. players
Kabyle people
Ligue 1 players
Ligue 2 players
China League One players
Super League Greece players
Expatriate footballers in Greece
Expatriate footballers in Kuwait
Expatriate footballers in China
Algerian expatriate sportspeople in Kuwait
Algerian expatriate sportspeople in Greece
Algerian expatriate sportspeople in China
Qadsia SC players